Siah Khuni may refer to:
 Siah Khuni, Siahkal
 Siah Khuni, Talesh